Hydrelia laetivirga is a moth in the family Geometridae first described by Louis Beethoven Prout in 1934. It is found in China.

References

Moths described in 1934
Asthenini
Moths of Asia